Anwar Elahi (1936 or 1937 – 2016) was a Pakistani cricketer who played first-class cricket irregularly from 1953 to 1969.

In November 1953, while still at school, Elahi made his first-class debut for Sind in the first-ever match in the Quaid-e-Azam Trophy. He took 4 for 64 with his leg-spin, Sind's best figures, in Bahawalpur's first innings. His brother Ikram Elahi top-scored for Sind with 63.

He worked as a businessman until his death from pneumonia in October 2016.

References

External links

1930s births
2016 deaths
Pakistani cricketers
Public Works Department cricketers
Karachi cricketers
Sindh cricketers